Þórður Þorláksson (14 August 163717 March 1697), also known by the Latinized name Theodorus Thorlacius, was the Lutheran bishop of Skálholt from 1674 until his death. Under Þórður's direction, the Church of Iceland's printing press was moved from Hólar í Hjaltadal to Skálholt where he established the first print archive in the country.

Family and early life
Þórður was the son of Þorlákur Skúlason, bishop of Hólar, and Kristín Gísladóttir. He studied at the Hólaskóli college before travelling to Denmark to attend the University of Copenhagen. Þórður returned to Iceland in 1660 to serve as headmaster of Hólaskóli but went abroad again in 1663 to study in Rostock and the Wittenberg. He also travelled to Paris, Belgium, and the Netherlands, as well as visiting Stangaland, Norway, where he worked with the historian Þormóður Torfason. During this time, Þórður wrote a history of Iceland, Dissertatio Chorographico-Historica de Islandia, which was published in 1666.

Bishop
Þórður was ordained as a Lutheran minister in Copenhagen on 25 February 1672. The following year, he returned to Hólar and took office as Bishop of Skálholt upon the resignation of Brynjólfur Sveinsson in 1674. In 1685, Þórður received approval from King Christian V to move the church's printing press from Hólar to Skálholt, where a lively printing business for both ecclesiastical and secular works began, including the first printed edition of the medieval Landnámabók in 1688. Other works published under Þórður's direction include Ari Þorgilsson's Íslendingabók, the Kristni saga, and a two-volume edition of The Greatest Saga of Óláfr Tryggvason. This last work included a number of the Icelandic sagas as part of the second volume. In all, more than 60 books were printed at Skálholt during Þórður's lifetime.

Þórður also produced maps of Iceland and Greenland, as well as a copy of Sigurður Stefánsson's map of ancient Norse sites in the western Atlantic. In addition to geography, Þórður was interested in agriculture and he oversaw experiments with different varieties of wheat in Skálholt.

Personal life
In 1674, Þórður married Guðríður Gísladóttir (1651–1707), daughter of Vísa-Gísla Magnússon, governor of Hlíðarendi. Their sons were Þorlákur, a school headmaster in Skálholt, and Brynjólfur, a farmer and district magistrate in Rangárvallasýsla.

References

1637 births
1697 deaths
17th-century Icelandic people
Lutheran bishops of Iceland
17th-century Lutheran bishops